The North Charleston Fire Museum and Educational Center is a fire museum in North Charleston, South Carolina, displaying a collection of fire fighting vehicles dating back to the 1780s.

On permanent loan from the American LaFrance Company, which was headquartered nearby until its closure in 2014, the  facility displays more than 20 restored vehicles, interactive exhibits and simulators.

Established in 2007 by the city of North Charleston, the museum is a popular rainy day activity for tourists.

Retired and active firefighters from the area provide tours for groups and area available to answer questions about the equipment and fire safety. Other exhibits include a 4-D film on the history of firefighting, robotic presentation on fire dangers in the home and a small playground area with a fire-pole and slide.

The Fire Museum is a stop on the route for some shuttle buses that operate between Charleston and its airport.

References

External links
Museum website

Firefighting museums in the United States
North Charleston, South Carolina
Museums established in 2007
2007 establishments in South Carolina
Museums in Charleston County, South Carolina
History museums in South Carolina
Firefighting in South Carolina